List of links to the governmental institutions of Germany

Executive power

The President
The Chancellor
The Cabinet

Legislative power

Bundesversammlung The Federal Assembly
Bundestag The Federal Diet
Bundesrat The Federal Council

Judicial power

Federal Constitutional Court Bundesverfassungsgericht
Federal Labor Court Bundesarbeitsgericht

See also
List of French institutions
Portal:Germany
Portal:Politics
Politics of Germany

Institutions
Institutions
Society-related lists